Kimberly Ann Connor (born October 31, 1980), or Connor-Hamby, is an American former professional boxer and mixed martial artist. In boxing, she challenged three times for world titles; the IBF female junior lightweight title in 2011; the  IBF female lightweight title in 2017; and the unified WBA and IBF female lightweight titles in 2018.

Professional boxing record

Mixed martial arts record

References

Living people
1980 births
American women boxers
Boxers from Texas
American female mixed martial artists
Super-featherweight boxers
Lightweight boxers
Bantamweight mixed martial artists
Mixed martial artists utilizing boxing
21st-century American women